Veniamin Mitchourine (born 7 April 1965 in Krasnousolsky, USSR) is a Russian Paralympic judoka.

In 1992, representing the Unified Team, he won the silver medal in 60kg. In 1996, representing Russia, he won the bronze in the same event. In 2000, he won another silver medal.

References

Paralympic judoka of Russia
Judoka at the 1992 Summer Paralympics
Judoka at the 1996 Summer Paralympics
Judoka at the 2000 Summer Paralympics
Paralympic silver medalists for Russia
Paralympic bronze medalists for Russia
Living people
1965 births
Russian male judoka
Medalists at the 1992 Summer Paralympics
Medalists at the 1996 Summer Paralympics
Medalists at the 2000 Summer Paralympics
Paralympic medalists in judo
Paralympic silver medalists for the Unified Team